Katherine L. Jansen  is an American historian and professor of medieval history at The Catholic University of America in Washington, D.C. She also has served as Visiting Professor at the Johns Hopkins University and Princeton University.

Biography
She received her Ph.D. from Princeton University, a student of William C. Jordan. Her scholarly interests are in the history of medieval Italy, religious cultures, and women and gender studies. Her first book was awarded the John Gilmary Shea Prize from the American Catholic Historical Association and the prize for the first book in the field of history from the Phi Alpha Theta Society. She has held fellowships from the Fulbright Foundation, the American Academy in Rome, Villa I Tatti, the National Endowment for the Humanities, the American Council of Learned Societies, Institute for Advanced Study and Princeton University, among others. 

In 2019 she was appointed Editor of Speculum journal. In 2020 she was elected Fellow of the Medieval Academy of America.

Selected publications 
The Making of the Magdalen: Preaching and Popular Devotion in the Later Middle Ages, publisher Princeton: Princeton University Press, 2000.
Medieval Italy: Texts in Translation, co-edited with Frances Andrews and Joanna Drell, publisher Philadelphia: University of Pennsylvania Press, 2009.
Charisma and Religious Authority: Jewish, Christian and Muslim Preaching, 1200-1500, co-edited with Miri Rubin, publisher Turnhout: Brepols, 2010.
Center and Periphery: Essays on Power in the Middle Ages in Honor of William Chester Jordan, co-edited with Guy Geltner and Anne E. Lester, publisher Leiden: Brill, 2013.
Peace and Penance in Late Medieval Italy, publisher Princeton: Princeton University Press, 2018.

References 

Living people
Fellows of the Medieval Academy of America
Catholic University of America faculty
Year of birth missing (living people)
Johns Hopkins University faculty
American women historians
Princeton University alumni
History journal editors